John Arthur Martinez (born June 10, 1961, in Austin, Texas) is an American country music artist. Martinez finished in second place on the first season of the USA Network talent show Nashville Star. In 2004, Martinez released a studio album for Dualtone Records, which produced one single on the Billboard Hot Country Singles & Tracks chart.

Discography

Albums

Singles

References

External links
Official website
JAM Records

American country singer-songwriters
Living people
Nashville Star contestants
Dualtone Records artists
1961 births
Musicians from Austin, Texas
Singer-songwriters from Texas